Sri Veeranjaneya Temple or Gandi Kshetram is a Hindu temple situated at Gandi, a village in Kadapa District of Andhra pradesh in India. The temple is dedicated to Lord Anjaneya(Hanuman) who is referred to as Veeranjaneya in this temple.

History 

The history of Kshetram dates back to the period of the Ramayana, Treta Yuga. According to the legend, Lord Rama himself had drawn the picture of Lord Hanuman on the rock with his arrow while resting at this place, and was receiving the hospitality of Lord Vayu (God of Air and Father of Lord Hanuman). Lord Sri Rama has completed the drawing of Lord Hanuman except the little finger of Lord Hanuman's left hand. Later Vyasaraja has sculptured this drawing into an idol, while Vyasaraja tried to sculpt even the little finger of Lord Hanuman's left hand, it is said that the finger of the idol was cut off by itself and started bleeding. Which displays Lord Hanuman's intention to keep the idol as drawn by Lord Sri Rama.

Legends also say that after listening to the news of Lord Sri Rama's Victory over the Demon Lord Ravana, Lord Vayu has decorated this place with festoon of golden flowers to welcome Lord Sri Rama on his way back towards North to Ayodhya. People believe that this festoon of golden flowers can be seen by those who are near to death.

Location 
This temple is known as Abhayahasta Anjaneya Temple and is located on the banks of River Papaghni. In Telugu language Gandi means a narrow passage for the water to flow out. This place seems to be a narrow passage for the river to flow in between the hills of Eastern ghats. This place located in Kadapa district and is 34 km away from the Pulivendula town.

Administration
The temple, at present is being administered by ENDOMENTS DEPT AP

References 

Hindu temples in Kadapa district
Tirumala Tirupati Devasthanams

3. Management change

https://www.thehindu.com/news/national/andhra-pradesh/uncertainty-over-gandi-temple-angers-devotees/article29292366.ece